Guilio Kukurugya was an American actor.

Career
Kukurugya was born in Coolspring Township, Pennsylvania.

On television, he played the voice of the villain Saw Boss on DiC Entertainment's Jayce and the Wheeled Warriors. His other roles in film and television include Instant Star, Angels in the Infield, Twice in a Lifetime, The Shooter and Night Heat.

External links

Year of birth missing (living people)
Living people
American male voice actors
American male film actors
American male television actors
Male actors from Pennsylvania